Colobothea vidua is a species of beetle in the family Cerambycidae. It was described by Bates in 1865. It is known from Guatemala, Honduras, and Mexico.

References

vidua
Beetles described in 1865